Softball was contested by six teams at the 2002 Asian Games in Busan, South Korea from September 30 to October 6. The competition took place at Gudeok Baseball Stadium.

Schedule

Medalists

Squads

Results
All times are Korea Standard Time (UTC+09:00)

Preliminary

Final round

Semifinals

Final

Grand final

 The ranking was decided with a result of preliminary round and semifinals due to rainy weather on final competition. Japan was awarded the gold medal based on its unbeaten record in preliminary games. China and Taiwan shared the silver. Those two were to have played to decide who would meet Japan in the gold-medal match.

Final standing

References

External links
 Official website

 
2002 Asian Games events
2002
Asian Games
2002 Asian Games